The École supérieure de journalisme (ESJ Lille) (in English: Superior School of Journalism of Lille) is an institution of higher education, a French Grande École in Lille dedicated to journalism and related studies. It has been elected best French journalism school in 2013 by Le Figaro.

History
Founded by the lawyer Paul Verschave (1878-1947), the ESJ Lille opens its doors on the first Tuesday of November, within the Catholic Faculties of Lille. In 1956, ESJ Lille was approved by the profession under the collective agreement of journalists, which limits to one year the professional training of its graduates.  
In 1960, ESJ Lille became a private higher education institution. Taking charge by his former pupils who create, according to the French law of 1901, the Association of the Higher School of Journalism of Lille. In 1969, the ESJ Lille was recognized by the State under the Decree of 24 April. In 1981, ESJ Lille moved into its current premises, 50 rue Gauthier-de-Châtillon, in the heart of Lille. It's still there. In 1983, the ESJ Lille diploma was recognized by the State, which authorizes it to issue a diploma bearing the official visa by virtue of the decree of 18 February 1983. The board of directors of ESJ Lille, including representatives of the professional circles (publishers and journalists) and alumni of the school, is enriched by the presence of representatives of higher education, local authorities, regional companies. In 2014, ESJ Lille created ESJ Lille Academy, a post-baccalaureate course in partnership with the Lille universities, enabling students to learn about the press and prepare for competitions in journalism schools. On 10, 11 and 12 October 2014, ESJ Lille celebrated its 90th anniversary.

Degree :
After the completion of two years of coursework, the school awards a diploma (similar to a Master's degree in the United States).

Online Degree :
The school has a partnership with the Paris-Saclay University in Versailles for an online degree in Climate Change and Media.

Academic partnerships
 University of Versailles Saint-Quentin-en-Yvelines
Paris-Saclay University
 Institut d'Administration des Entreprises
 University of Lille

Notable alumni
Benoît Duquesne
Henri Aubry
Benoît Bringer
Jean-Paul Kauffmann
Christian Prudhomme

References

External links
 "École supérieure de journalisme de Lille", Official website

Educational institutions established in 1924
Education in Lille
Grands établissements
Journalism schools in France
1924 establishments in France